Anisopleura comes
Anisopleura furcata
Anisopleura lestoides
Anisopleura lieftincki
Anisopleura qingyuanensis
Anisopleura subplatystyla
Anisopleura trulla
Anisopleura vallei
Anisopleura yunnanensis
Anisopleura zhengi
Bayadera bidentata
Bayadera brevicauda
Bayadera fasciata
Bayadera forcipata
Bayadera hyalina
Bayadera indica
Bayadera kali
Bayadera kirbyi
Bayadera lonicauda
Bayadera melania
Bayadera melanopteryx
Bayadera nephelopennis
Bayadera serrata
Bayadera strigata
Cryptophaea saukra
Crytophaea vietnamenis
Crytophaea yunnanensis
Cyclophaea cyanifrons
Dysphaea basitincta
Dysphaea dimidiata
Dysphaea ethela
Dysphaea gloriosa
Dysphaea lugens
Dysphaea walli
Epallage fatime
Euphaea ameeka
Euphaea amphicyana
Euphaea aspasia
Euphaea basalis
Euphaea bocki
Euphaea cardinalis
Euphaea compar
Euphaea cora
Euphaea decorata
Euphaea dispar
Euphaea formosa
Euphaea fraseri
Euphaea guerini
Euphaea hirta
Euphaea impar
Euphaea laidlowi
Euphaea lara
Euphaea masoni
Euphaea modigliani
Euphaea ochracea
Euphaea opaca
Euphaea ornata
Euphaea pahyapi
Euphaea refulgens
Euphaea splendens
Euphaea subcostalis
Euphaea subnodalis
Euphaea superba
Euphaea tricolor
Euphaea variegata
Euphaea yayeyamana
Heterophaea barbata
Heterophaea ruficollis
Schmidtiphaea schmidi

References